Island FM is an Independent Local Radio station broadcasting across the Bailiwick of Guernsey on 104.7FM and 93.7FM in Alderney.

Launched in 1992, Island FM remains the sole commercial station in the island and continues to be extremely successful with high listenership figures.

Listening figures under a 2018 RAJAR survey showed that out of a population of 53,000 adults, 31,000 listened each week, at an average of 11.6 hours per person giving a 37% market share.

As of December 2022, the station broadcasts to a weekly audience of 25,000 with a listening share of 27.2%, according to RAJAR.

History
Island FM was founded by Guernsey businessman Kevin Stewart, who was the station's Managing Director until 2002.

In February 1998, Sir Ray Tindle acquired Island FM and the station became the first part of the Tindle Radio Group, which later went on to purchase Jersey's Channel 103

In late 2020, Island FM became a part of Bauer's Hits Radio Network for commercial sales. It remains owned by Tindle with no shared programming.

Island FM began digital radio transmissions, alongside Channel 103, on 1 August 2021 with the launch of the local Ofcom-licensed DAB multiplex for the Channel Islands.

Programming

Island FM's core audience is the 15-45 age group, playing contemporary hits - predominantly from the 1980s to the present day.

News bulletins are presented locally from 6am until 6pm, Monday to Friday. The station's weekend news service broadcasts local content, presented either from Jersey or Guernsey from 8am until noon. Sky News provides the service outside these times.

Transmission
Island FM has broadcast on 104.7 FM in Guernsey and 93.7 FM in Alderney since launching in 1992.

The station began DAB+ transmissions, alongside those of Channel 103, on 1 August 2021 with the launch of the local Ofcom-licensed DAB multiplex for the Channel Islands. This service is radiated from transmitters at Les Touillets in Guernsey and Les Platons in Jersey.

References

External links
 Official site

Radio stations in Guernsey